Issa Ahmed Ghaderi (Arabic:عيسى أحمد قادري) (born 3 March 1998) is a Qatari footballer. He currently plays as a midfielder for Lusail.

Career
Ghaderi started his career at Al Ahli and is a product of the Al-Ahli's youth system. On 8 April 2018, Ghaderi made his professional debut for Al-Ahli against Al-Rayyan in the Pro League, replacing Abdulla Afifa .

External links

References

1998 births
Living people
Qatari footballers
Al Ahli SC (Doha) players
Lusail SC players
Qatar Stars League players
Qatari Second Division players
Association football midfielders
Place of birth missing (living people)